The 2009 Asian Cycling Championships took place at the Tenggarong Velodrome in Tenggarong and Samarinda, Indonesia from 14 to 20 August 2009.

Medal summary

Road

Men

Women

Track

Men

Women

Medal table

References

External links
 Official website
 Asian Cycling Confederation

Asia
Asia
Cycling
Asian Cycling Championships
Asian Cycling Championships